Donje Crniljevo is a village in Serbia. It is situated on the banks of the Tamnava river in the Koceljeva municipality, in the Mačva District of Central Serbia. The village had a Serb ethnic majority and a population of 981 in 2002.

Historical population

1948: 1,498
1953: 1,561
1961: 1,422
1971: 1,344
1981: 1,292
1991: 1,149
2002: 981

References

See also
List of places in Serbia

Populated places in Mačva District